Bird on 52nd St. is a live album by the saxophonist Charlie Parker. It was recorded in July 1948 at the Onyx Club on a non-professional tape recorder and first released in 1957 on the Jazz Workshop label as JWS 501. Several tracks are incomplete. AllMusic reviewer Scott Yanow wrote that Parker "plays quite brilliantly on this live set", but because of seriously deficient sound quality which "sometimes borders on the unlistenable" the album can be considered as being "for true Charlie Parker completists only."

Track listing
"52nd Street Theme" (Thelonious Monk) - 2:19
"Shaw 'Nuff" (Ray Brown, Gil Fuller, Dizzy Gillespie) - 1:33
"Out of Nowhere" (Johnny Green, Edward Heyman) - 3:05
"Hot House" (Tadd Dameron) - 2:15
"This Time the Dream's on Me" (Harold Arlen, Johnny Mercer) - 2:21
"A Night in Tunisia" (Dizzy Gillespie) - 3:29
"My Old Flame" (Sam Coslow, Arthur Johnston) - 3:24
"52nd Street Theme" - 1:05
"The Way You Look Tonight" (Jerome Kern, Dorothy Fields) - 4:42
"Out of Nowhere" - 2:35
"Chasin' the Bird" (Parker) - 1:47
"This Time the Dreams's on Me" - 3:29
"Dizzy at Atmosphere" (Gillespie) - 2:59
"How High the Moon" (Nancy Hamilton, Morgan Lewis) - 3:38
"52nd Street Theme" - 1:14

Personnel
Charlie Parker - alto saxophone
Miles Davis - trumpet
Duke Jordan - piano
Tommy Potter - bass
Max Roach - drums

References

1957 live albums
Charlie Parker albums